Richdale is an unincorporated community in Otter Tail County, in the U.S. state of Minnesota.

History
Richdale was platted in 1899, and named for Watson Wellman Rich, a railroad engineer. A post office was established at Richdale in 1900, and remained in operation until it was discontinued in 1916.

References

Unincorporated communities in Otter Tail County, Minnesota
Unincorporated communities in Minnesota